The Critter Crunch is a table top combat robot competition that takes place annually at the
MileHiCon science fiction convention.  Established in 1986 with the first competition held in 1987, it is widely accepted as the first combat robot competition.

 preceding the Robot Wars TV series by more than decade.

History

The competition was proposed by the Denver Mad Scientists club and organized by member Bill Llewellin.
In the months before the 1987 convention the club produced a set of rules which were distributed without copyright restriction, allowing other organizations use or extend them for their own competitions.

The first competition was held on a hotel table.  The original rules prohibited damaging the surface.  There were several competitors including a remote control dune buggy, a mechanical device under a steel mixing bowl, and a little yellow remote control corvette that could only go forward or backwards and turn.  The first competition was won by the corvette.

The last revision to the official rules was on 15 Feb 2003.  By then the rules had evolved to include mention of radio controls, attacking control systems, limiting the number of operators to one, and codifying two part critters loss conditions

References

Robotics events
Robotics competitions
Robot combat competitions